Pirmin Werner (born 10 January 2000) is a Swiss freestyle skier.

He participated at the mixed aerials event at the FIS Freestyle Ski and Snowboarding World Championships 2021.

References

External links

Living people
2000 births
Swiss male freestyle skiers
Freestyle skiers at the 2022 Winter Olympics
Olympic freestyle skiers of Switzerland
21st-century Swiss people